In Christian eschatology, the Antichrist refers to people prophesied by the Bible to oppose Jesus Christ and substitute themselves in Christ's place before the Second Coming. The term Antichrist (including one plural form) is found four times in the New Testament, solely in the First and Second Epistle of John. The Antichrist is announced as the one "who denies the Father and the Son."

The similar term pseudokhristos or "false Christ" is also found in the Gospels. In Matthew (chapter 24) and Mark (chapter 13), Jesus alerts his disciples not to be deceived by the false prophets, who will claim themselves as being Christ, performing "great signs and wonders". Three other images often associated with the singular Antichrist are the "little horn" in Daniel's final vision, the "man of sin" in Paul the Apostle's Second Epistle to the Thessalonians, and the Beast of the Sea in the Book of Revelation.

Etymology
Antichrist is translated from the combination of two ancient Greek words  (anti + Christos). In Greek,  means "anointed one" and the word Christ derives from it. "" means not only anti in the sense of "against" and "opposite of", but also "in place of".

History

New Testament
Whether the New Testament contains an individual Antichrist is disputed. The Greek term antikhristos originates in 1 John. The similar term pseudokhristos ("False Messiah") is also first found in the New Testament, but never used by Josephus in his accounts of various false messiahs. The concept of an antikhristos is not found in Jewish writings in the period 500 BC–50 AD. However, Bernard McGinn conjectures that the concept may have been generated by the frustration of Jews subject to often-capricious Seleucid or Roman rule, who found the nebulous Jewish idea of a Satan who is more of an opposing angel of God in the heavenly court insufficiently humanised and personalised to be a satisfactory incarnation of evil and threat.

The five uses of the term "antichrist" or "antichrists" in the Johannine epistles do not clearly present a single latter-day individual Antichrist. The articles "the deceiver" or "the antichrist" are usually seen as marking out a certain category of persons, rather than an individual.

Consequently, attention for an individual Antichrist figure focuses on the second chapter of 2 Thessalonians. However, the term "antichrist" is never used in this passage:

Although the word "antichrist" (Greek antikhristos) is used only in the Epistles of John, the similar word "pseudochrist" (Greek pseudokhristos, meaning "false messiah") is used by Jesus in the Gospels:

Early Church

The second or first century book, Odes of Solomon, written by an Essene convert into Christianity, makes mention of the Antichrist in figurative terms, where the redeemer overcomes the monstrous dragon. 

The only one of the late 1st/early 2nd century Apostolic Fathers to use the term is Polycarp (c. 69 – c. 155) who warned the Philippians that everyone who preached false doctrine was an antichrist. His use of the term Antichrist follows that of the New Testament in not identifying a single personal Antichrist, but a class of people.

Irenaeus (2nd century AD – c. 202) wrote Against Heresies to refute the teachings of the Gnostics. In Book V of Against Heresies he addresses the figure of the Antichrist referring to him as the "recapitulation of apostasy and rebellion." He uses "666", the Number of the Beast from Revelation 13:18, to numerologically decode several possible names. Some names that he loosely proposed were "Evanthos", "Lateinos" ("Latin" or pertaining to the Roman Empire). In his exegesis of Daniel 7:21, he stated that the ten horns of the beast will be the Roman empire divided into ten kingdoms before the Antichrist's arrival. Additionally, he stated that the antichrist would be of the tribe of Dan, evoking Jeremiah 8:16. This would correlate to the Talmudic view of the Jewish Messiah coming from the tribe of Dan on his maternal line. However, his readings of the Antichrist were more in broader theological terms rather than within a historical context.

The non-canonical Ascension of Isaiah presents a detailed exposition of the Antichrist as Belial and Nero.

Tertullian (c. 160 – c. 220 AD) held that the Roman Empire was the restraining force written about by Paul in 2 Thessalonians 2:7–8. The fall of the Western Roman Empire and the disintegration of the ten provinces of the Roman Empire into ten kingdoms were to make way for the Antichrist.

Hippolytus of Rome (c. 170 – c. 236) held that the Antichrist would come from the tribe of Dan and would rebuild the Jewish temple on the Temple Mount in order to reign from it. He identified the Antichrist with the Beast out of the Earth from the book of Revelation.

Origen (185–254) refuted Celsus' view of the Antichrist. Origen utilized scriptural citations from Daniel, Paul, and the Gospels. He argued:

Post-Nicene Christianity

Cyril of Jerusalem, in the mid-4th century, delivered his 15th catechetical lecture about the Second Coming of Jesus Christ, in which he also lectures about the Antichrist, who will reign as the ruler of the world for three and a half years, before he is killed by Jesus Christ right at the end of his three-and-a-half-year reign, shortly after which the Second Coming of Jesus Christ will happen.

Athanasius of Alexandria (c. 298–373)  wrote that Arius of Alexandria is to be associated with the Antichrist, saying, "And ever since [the Council of Nicaea] has Arius's error been reckoned for a heresy more than ordinary, being known as Christ's foe, and harbinger of Antichrist."

John Chrysostom (c. 347–407) warned against speculating about the Antichrist, saying, "Let us not therefore enquire into these things". He preached that by knowing Paul's description of the Antichrist in 2 Thessalonians, Christians would avoid deception.

Jerome (c. 347–420) warned that those substituting false interpretations for the actual meaning of scripture belonged to the "synagogue of the Antichrist".  "He that is not of Christ is of Antichrist", he wrote to Pope Damasus I.  He believed that "the mystery of lawlessness" written about by Paul in 2 Thessalonians 2:7 was already in action when "every one chatters about his views."  To Jerome, the power restraining this mystery of lawlessness was the Roman Empire, but as it fell this restraining force was removed. He warned a noble woman of Gaul:

In his Commentary on Daniel, Jerome noted, "Let us not follow the opinion of some commentators and suppose him to be either the Devil or some demon, but rather, one of the human race, in whom Satan will wholly take up his residence in bodily form." Instead of rebuilding the Jewish Temple to reign from, Jerome thought the Antichrist sat in God's Temple inasmuch as he made "himself out to be like God." He refuted Porphyry's idea that the "little horn" mentioned in Daniel chapter 7 was Antiochus IV Epiphanes by noting that the "little horn" is defeated by an eternal, universal ruler, right before the final judgment. Instead, he advocated that the "little horn" was the Antichrist:

Circa 380, an apocalyptic pseudo-prophecy falsely attributed to the Tiburtine Sibyl describes Constantine as victorious over Gog and Magog. Later on, it predicts:

Augustine of Hippo (354–430) wrote "it is uncertain in what temple [the Antichrist] shall sit, whether in that ruin of the temple which was built by Solomon, or in the Church."

Pope Gregory I wrote to the Byzantine Emperor Maurice in A.D. 597, concerning the titles of bishops, "I say with confidence that whoever calls or desires to call himself 'universal priest' in self-exaltation of himself is a precursor of the Antichrist."

By the end of the tenth century, Adso of Montier-en-Der, a Benedictine monk, compiled a biography of Antichrist based on a variety of exegetical and Sibylline sources; his account became one of the best-known descriptions of Antichrist in the Middle Ages.

De Antichristo libri undecim, published by Tomàs Maluenda in 1604, is still considered the most complete treatise on the subject.

Pre-Reformation Western Church accusers

Arnulf, archbishop of Reims disagreed with the policies and morals of Pope John XV. He expressed his views while presiding over the Council of Reims in A.D. 991. Arnulf accused John XV of being the Antichrist while also using the 2 Thessalonians passage about the "man of lawlessness" (or "lawless one"), saying: "Surely, if he is empty of charity and filled with vain knowledge and lifted up, he is Antichrist sitting in God's temple and showing himself as God." This incident is history's earliest record of anyone identifying a pope with the Antichrist (see Christian Historicism).

Pope Gregory VII (c. 1015 or 1029 – 1085), struggled against, in his own words, "a robber of temples, a perjurer against the Holy Roman Church, notorious throughout the whole Roman world for the basest of crimes, namely, Wilbert, plunderer of the holy church of Ravenna, Antichrist, and arch-heretic."

Cardinal Benno, on the opposite side of the Investiture Controversy, wrote long descriptions of abuses committed by Gregory VII, including necromancy, torture of a former friend upon a bed of nails, commissioning an attempted assassination, executions without trials, unjust excommunication, doubting the Real presence of Christ in the Eucharist, and even burning it. Benno held that Gregory VII was "either a member of Antichrist, or Antichrist himself."

Eberhard II von Truchsees, Prince-Archbishop of Salzburg in 1241, denounced Pope Gregory IX at the Council of Regensburg as "that man of perdition, whom they call Antichrist, who in his extravagant boasting says, I am God, I cannot err." He argued that the ten kingdoms that the Antichrist is involved with were the "Turks, Greeks, Egyptians, Africans, Spaniards, French, English, Germans, Sicilians, and Italians who now occupy the provinces of Rome." He held that the papacy was the "little horn" of Daniel 7:8:

Protestant Reformation

Protestant Reformers, including John Wycliffe, Martin Luther, John Calvin, Thomas Cranmer, John Thomas, John Knox, Roger Williams, Cotton Mather, and John Wesley, as well as most Protestants of the 16th-18th centuries, felt that the Early Church had been led into the Great Apostasy by the Papacy and identified the Pope with the Antichrist. Luther declared that not just a pope from time to time was Antichrist, but the Papacy was Antichrist because they were "the representatives of an institution opposed to Christ". The Centuriators of Magdeburg, a group of Lutheran scholars in Magdeburg headed by Matthias Flacius, wrote the 12-volume Magdeburg Centuries to discredit the Catholic Church and lead other Christians to recognize the Pope as the Antichrist. So, rather than expecting a single Antichrist to rule the earth during a future Tribulation period, Martin Luther, John Calvin, and other Protestant Reformers saw the Antichrist as a present feature in the world of their time, fulfilled in the Papacy.

Among the others who interpreted the biblical prophecy historically there were many Church Fathers; Justin Martyr wrote about the Antichrist: "He Whom Daniel foretells would have dominion for a time and times and a half, is even now at the door". Irenaeus wrote in Against Heresies about the coming of the Antichrist: "This Antichrist shall ... devastate all things ... But then, the Lord will come from Heaven on the clouds ... for the righteous". Tertullian looking to the Antichrist wrote: "He is to sit in the temple of God, and boast himself as being god. In our view, he is Antichrist as taught us in both the ancient and the new prophecies; and especially by the Apostle John, who says that 'already many false-prophets are gone out into the world' as the fore-runners of Antichrist". Hippolytus of Rome in his Treatise on Christ and Antichrist wrote: "As Daniel also says (in the words) 'I considered the Beast, and look! There were ten horns behind it – among which shall rise another (horn), an offshoot, and shall pluck up by the roots the three (that were) before it.' And under this, was signified none other than Antichrist." Athanasius of Alexandria clearly hold to the historical view in his many writings; in The Deposition of Arius, he wrote: "I addressed the letter to Arius and his fellows, exhorting them to renounce his impiety.... There have gone forth in this diocese at this time certain lawless men – enemies of Christ – teaching an apostasy which one may justly suspect and designate as a forerunner of Antichrist".

Some Franciscans had considered the Emperor Frederick II a positive Antichrist who would purify the Catholic Church from opulence, riches and clergy.

Historicist interpretations of Book of Revelation usually included the identification of one or more of the following:
 the Antichrist (1 and 2 John);
 the Beast of Revelation 13; 
 the Man of Sin, or Man of Lawlessness, of 2 Thessalonians 2; 
 the "Little horn" of Daniel 7 and 8;
 The Abomination of desolation of Daniel 9, 11, and 12; and
 the Whore of Babylon of Revelation 17.

The Protestant Reformers tended to hold the belief that the Antichrist power would be revealed so that everyone would comprehend and recognize that the Pope is the real, true Antichrist and not the vicar of Christ. Doctrinal works of literature published by the Lutherans, the Reformed Churches, the Presbyterians, the Baptists, the Anabaptists, and the Methodists contain references to the Pope as the Antichrist, including the Smalcald Articles, Article 4 (1537), the Treatise on the Power and Primacy of the Pope written by Philip Melanchthon (1537), the Westminster Confession, Article 25.6 (1646), and the 1689 Baptist Confession of Faith, Article 26.4. In 1754, John Wesley published his Explanatory Notes Upon the New Testament, which is currently an official Doctrinal Standard of the United Methodist Church. In his notes on the Book of Revelation (chapter 13), he commented: "The whole succession of Popes from Gregory VII are undoubtedly Antichrists. Yet this hinders not, but that the last Pope in this succession will be more eminently the Antichrist, the Man of Sin, adding to that of his predecessors a peculiar degree of wickedness from the bottomless pit."

The identification of the Pope with the Antichrist was so ingrained in the Reformation Era, that Luther himself stated it repeatedly:

 and,

John Calvin similarly wrote:

John Knox wrote on the Pope:

Thomas Cranmer on the Antichrist wrote:

John Wesley, speaking of the identity given in the Bible of the Antichrist, wrote:

Roger Williams wrote about the Pope:

The identification of the Roman Catholic Church as the apostate power written of in the Bible as the Antichrist became evident to many as the Reformation began, including John Wycliffe, who was well known throughout Europe for his opposition to the doctrine and practices of the Catholic Church, which he believed had clearly deviated from the original teachings of the early Church and to be contrary to the Bible. Wycliffe himself tells (Sermones, III. 199) how he concluded that there was a great contrast between what the Church was and what it ought to be, and saw the necessity for reform. Along with John Hus, they had started the inclination toward ecclesiastical reforms of the Catholic Church.

When the Swiss Reformer Huldrych Zwingli became the pastor of the Grossmünster in Zurich (1518) he began to preach ideas on reforming the Catholic Church.  Zwingli, who was a Catholic priest before he became a Reformer, often referred to the Pope as the Antichrist. He wrote: "I know that in it works the might and power of the Devil, that is, of the Antichrist".

The English Reformer William Tyndale held that while the Roman Catholic realms of that age were the empire of Antichrist, any religious organization that distorted the doctrine of the Old and New Testaments also showed the work of Antichrist. In his treatise The Parable of the Wicked Mammon, he expressly rejected the established Church teaching that looked to the future for an Antichrist to rise up, and he taught that Antichrist is a present spiritual force that will be with us until the end of the age under different religious disguises from time to time. Tyndale's translation of 2 Thessalonians, chapter 2, concerning the "Man of Lawlessness" reflected his understanding, but was significantly amended by later revisers, including the King James Bible committee, which followed the Vulgate more closely.

In 1973, the  United States Conference of Catholic Bishops' Committee on Ecumenical and Interreligious Affairs and the USA National Committee of the Lutheran World Federation in the official Catholic–Lutheran dialogue officially signed an agreement on Papal Primacy and the Universal Church, including this passage:

In 1988 Ian Paisley, Evangelical minister and founder of the Free Presbyterian Church of Ulster, made headlines in an infamous manner by accusing Pope John Paul II as the Antichrist during one of the pope's speeches before the European Parliament, which at the time Paisley was member of. His accusation, and the reactions of both Pope John Paul II and other members of the European Parliament, was recorded on video.

The Wisconsin Evangelical Lutheran Synod states about the Pope and the Catholic Church:

Currently, many Protestant and Restorationist denominations still officially maintain that the Papacy is the Antichrist, such as the conservative Lutheran Churches and the Seventh-day Adventists.

Counter Reformation
In the Counter-Reformation, the views of Preterism and Futurism were advanced by Catholic Jesuits beginning in the 16th century in response to the identification of the Papacy as Antichrist. These were rival methods of prophetic interpretation: the futurist and the preterist systems both are in conflict with the historicist method of interpretation.

Historically, preterists and non-preterists have agreed that the Jesuit Luis de Alcasar  (1554–1613) wrote the first systematic preterist exposition of prophecy—Vestigatio arcani sensus in Apocalypsi (published in 1614)—during the Counter-Reformation.

Christian views

Roman Catholicism
From the Fifth Council of the Lateran, the Catholic Church teaches that priests may not "preach or declare a fixed time for...the coming of antichrist..." The church also teaches that it must undergo trials before the Second Coming, and that the church's ultimate trial will be the mystery of iniquity. In Judaism, iniquity is a sin done out of moral failing. The mystery of iniquity, according to the church, will be a religious deception: Christians receiving alleged solutions to their problems at the cost of apostasy. The supreme religious deception, according to the church, will be the Antichrist's messianism: mankind glorifying himself rather than God and Jesus. The church teaches that this supreme deception is committed by people who claim to fulfill Israel's messianic hopes, such as millenarianism and secular messianicism.

Popes
Pope Pius IX in the encyclical Quartus Supra, quoting Cyprian, said Satan disguises the Antichrist with the title of Christ. Pope Pius X in the encyclical E Supremi said that the distinguishing mark of the Antichrist is claiming to be God and taking his place. Pope John Paul II, in his August 18, 1985 address on his apostolic journey to Africa, said 1 John 4:3 ("Every spirit which does not confess Jesus is not of God. This is the spirit of antichrist") evokes the danger of theology divorced from holiness and theological culture divorced from serving Christ. Pope Benedict XVI said in the Sunday Angelus of March 11, 2012 that violence is the tool of the Antichrist. In the General Audience of November 12, 2008, Benedict XVI said Christian tradition had come to identify the son of perdition as the Antichrist. Pope Francis, in his morning meditation of February 2, 2014, said that Christian faith is not an ideology, but that "the Apostle James says that ideologues of the faith are the Antichrist." In his morning meditation of September 19, 2014, Francis said the Antichrist must come before the final resurrection. In his morning meditation of January 7, 2016, he said the evil spirit spoken of in 1 John 4:6 is the Antichrist. In his morning meditation on November 11, 2016, Francis said whoever says the criteria of Christian love is not the Incarnation is the Antichrist.

Speculation

The Prophecy of the Popes claims Rome will be destroyed during the pontificate of the last Pope, implying a connection to the Antichrist.

Fulton J. Sheen, a Catholic bishop, wrote in 1951:

Catechism of the Catholic Church

The Catechism of the Catholic Church, which John Paul II said is a "sure norm for teaching the faith," puts the doctrine on the Antichrist under a subsection entitled "The Church's Ultimate Trial," equating it with "the supreme religious deception" and "pseudo-messianism" of human "self-glorification":

Eastern Orthodox
Throughout history, various ecclesiastics of the Eastern Orthodox Church have identified the office of the Roman Catholic papacy with the antichrist. Russian Orthodox Metropolitan Anthony Khrapovitsky, in explaining the necessity of rebaptism for Roman Catholics, Protestants and Nestorians, declared:

In a Christmas 2018 interview on Russian state television, Patriarch Kirill of Moscow warned that "The Antichrist is the person that will be at the head of the world wide web controlling all of humanity. That means that the structure itself poses a danger. There shouldn't be a single centre, at least not in the foreseeable future, if we don't want to bring on the apocalypse." He exhorted listeners not to "fall into slavery to what's in your hands"..."You should remain free inside and not fall under any addiction, not to alcohol, not to narcotics, not to gadgets."

Old Believers
After Patriarch Nikon of Moscow reformed the Russian Orthodox Church during the second half of the 17th century, a large number of Old Believers held that Peter the Great, the Tsar of the Russian Empire until his death in 1725, was the Antichrist because of his treatment of the Orthodox Church, namely subordinating the church to the state, requiring clergymen to conform to the standards of all Russian civilians (shaved beards, being fluent in French), and requiring them to pay state taxes.
There are two conceptions of the Antichrist among the Old Believers: the spiritual Antichrist and the sensual Antichrist. The sensual means a particular person who will rule at the end of times for literal 3,5 years. The priested Old believers mostly adhere to this conception. The spiritual Antichrist is said to rule in the heretical church and state as a spirit through many people - since 1000 in the West and since 1666 in Russia. The true priesthood is considered to be lacking in the world due to 'abomination of desolation', which is synonimous with the rule of Antichrist. Most non-priested Old believers adhere to this conception (except the so called "Chasovennye").

Age of Enlightenment
Bernard McGinn noted that complete denial of the Antichrist was rare until the Age of Enlightenment. Following frequent use of "Antichrist" laden rhetoric during religious controversies in the 17th century, the use of the concept declined during the 18th century due to the rule of enlightened absolutists, who as European rulers of the time wielded significant influence over official state churches. These efforts to cleanse Christianity of "legendary" or "folk" accretions effectively removed the Antichrist from discussion in mainstream Western churches.

Church of Jesus Christ of Latter-Day Saints
In the Church of Jesus Christ of Latter-day Saints, the "Antichrist" is anyone or anything that counterfeits the true gospel or plan of salvation and that openly or secretly is set up in opposition to Christ. The great antichrist is Lucifer, but he has many assistants both as spirit beings and as mortals." Latter-day Saints use the New Testament scriptures, 1 John 2:18, 22; 1 John 4:3–6; 2 John 1:7 and the Book of Mormon, Jacob 7:1–23, Alma 1:2–16, Alma 30:6–60, in their exegesis or interpretation of the Antichrist.

Seventh-day Adventists
Seventh-day Adventists teach that the "Little Horn Power", which (as predicted in the Book of Daniel) rose after the break-up of the Roman Empire, is the Papacy. The Western Roman Empire collapsed in the late 5th century. In 533, Justinian I, the emperor of the Eastern Roman Empire (which historians have labelled the Byzantine Empire), legally recognized the bishop (pope) of Rome as the head of all the Christian churches.
Because of the Arian domination of some of the Roman Empire by barbarian tribes, the bishop of Rome could not fully exercise such authority. In 538, Belisarius, one of Justinian's generals, succeeded in withstanding a siege of the city of Rome by Arian Ostrogoth besiegers, and the bishop of Rome could begin establishing universal civil authority. So, by the military intervention of the Eastern Roman Empire, the bishop of Rome became all-powerful throughout the area of the old Roman Empire. The Ostrogoths promptly re-captured the city of Rome eight years later in 546, and again in 550.

Seventh-day Adventists understand the 1260 years as lasting AD 538 to 1798 as the (supposed) duration of the papacy's domination over Rome. This period is seen as starting from one of the defeats of the Ostrogoths by the general Belisarius and as ending with the successes of French general Napoleon Bonaparte, specifically, with the capture of Pope Pius VI by general Louis Alexandre Berthier in 1798.

Like many Reformation-era Protestant leaders, the Adventist pioneer Ellen G. White (1827–1915) spoke of the Catholic Church as a fallen church in preparation for its nefarious eschatological role as the antagonist against God's true church; she saw the pope as the Antichrist.  Protestant reformers such as Martin Luther, John Knox, William Tyndale and others held similar beliefs about the Catholic Church and the papacy when they broke away from the Catholic Church during the Reformation.

Ellen White writes,

Seventh-day Adventists view the length of time the apostate church's unbridled power was permitted to rule as shown in Daniel 7:25: "The little horn would rule a time and times and half a time" - or 1,260 years. They regard papal rule as supreme in Europe from 538 (when the Arian Ostrogoths retreated from Rome into temporary oblivion) until 1798 (when the French general Louis-Alexandre Berthier took Pope Pius VI captive)—a period of 1,260 years - including the 67 years of the Avignon Captivity (1309-1376).

Other Christian interpretations

Martin Wight
The devout Christian and political theorist Martin Wight, writing immediately after World War II, favoured the revival of the Antichrist doctrine not as a person, but as a recurrent situation featuring "demonic concentrations of power."

As "man of lawlessness"

The Antichrist has been equated with the "man of lawlessness" or "lawless one" of 2 Thessalonians 2:3, though commentaries on the identity of the "man of lawlessness" greatly vary. The "man of lawlessness" has been identified with Caligula, Nero, and the end times Antichrist. Some scholars believe that the passage contains no genuine prediction, but represents a speculation of the apostle's own, based on contemporary ideas of the Antichrist.

As "being in league with other figures"
Several American evangelical and fundamentalist theologians, including Cyrus Scofield, have identified the Antichrist as being in league with (or the same as) several figures in the Book of Revelation including the Dragon (or Serpent), the Beast, the False Prophet, and the Whore of Babylon.

As Satan
Bernard McGinn described multiple traditions detailing the relationship between the Antichrist and Satan. In the dualist approach, Satan will become incarnate in the Antichrist, just as God became incarnate in Jesus. However, in orthodox Christian thought, this view was problematic because it was too similar to Christ's incarnation and suggested dualism. Instead, the "indwelling" view became more accepted. It stipulates that the Antichrist is a human figure inhabited by Satan, since the latter's power is not to be seen as equivalent to God's. Luca Signorelli's fresco, The Sermon and Deeds of the Antichrist (see above), depicts the indwelling view. Satan whispers in the ear of this Christlike figure and his left arm is slipped through the Antichrist's garment as if he is manipulating him.

Non-Christian views

Judaism
There are warnings against false prophets in the Old Testament of the bible.

An anti-Messiah figure known as Armilus, said to be the offspring of Satan and a virgin, appears in some schools of Jewish eschatology, such as the 7th century CE Sefer Zerubbabel and 11th century CE Midrash Vayosha. He is stated to be the God and Messiah of the Christians, making him identical to Jesus Christ. He is described as "a monstrosity, bald-headed, with one large and one small eye, deaf in the right ear and maimed in the right arm, while the left arm is two and one-half ells long." Being considered similar to, or even identical with Gog, his believed destruction by a "Messiah ben Joseph" (Messiah, of the tribe of Joseph) symbolizes the ultimate victory of the Jewish Messiah in the Messianic Age.

Islam

Al-Masih ad-Dajjal, or in short Ad-Dajjal (الدجّال), is an evil figure in Islamic eschatology, who will appear after the coming of the Mahdi. The Dajjal is never mentioned in the Quran but he is mentioned and described in the ḥadīth literature. The Dajjal is described as one eyed (blind in the right eye) and the blind eye looks like a bulging out grape. Like in Christianity, the Dajjal is said to emerge out in the east, although the specific location varies among the various sources. He will imitate the miracles performed by ʿĪsā (Jesus), such as healing the sick and raising the dead, the latter done with the aid of demons (Shayāṭīn). He will deceive many people, such as weavers, magicians, half-castes, children of prostitutes, and non believers but the majority of his followers will be Jews. According to the Islamic eschatological narrative, the events related to the final battle before the Day of Judgment will proceed in the following order:

Imam Mahdi (meaning "the rightly guided one") is the redeemer according to Islam. Just like the Dajjal, the Mahdi is never mentioned in the Quran but his description can be found in the ḥadīth literature; according to the Islamic eschatological narrative, he will appear on Earth before the Day of Judgment. At the time of the Second Coming of Christ, the prophet ʿĪsā shall return to defeat and kill al-Masih ad-Dajjal. Muslims believe that both ʿĪsā and the Mahdi will rid the world of wrongdoing, injustice, and tyranny, ensuring peace and tranquility. Eventually, the Dajjal will be killed by theʿĪsā at the gate of Lud, who upon seeing Dajjal will cause him to slowly dissolve (like salt in water).

Ahmadiyya

Prophecies concerning the emergence of the Antichrist (Al-Masīḥ ad-Dajjāl) are interpreted in Ahmadiyya teachings as designating a specific group of nations centred upon a false theology (or Christology) instead of an individual, with the reference to the Antichrist as an individual indicating its unity as a class or system rather than its personal individuality. As such, Ahmadis identify the Antichrist collectively with the missionary expansion and colonial dominance of European Christianity throughout the world that was propelled by the Industrial Revolution. Mirza Ghulam Ahmad wrote extensively on this topic, identifying the Antichrist principally with colonial missionaries who, according to him, were to be countered through argumentation rather than by physical warfare and whose power and influence was to gradually disintegrate, ultimately allowing for the recognition and worship of God along Islamic ideals to prevail throughout the world in a period similar to the period of time it took for nascent Christianity to rise through the Roman Empire. The teaching that Jesus was a mortal man who survived crucifixion and died a natural death, as propounded by Ghulam Ahmad, has been seen by some scholars in this regard as a move to neutralise Christian soteriologies of Jesus and to project the superior rationality of Islam.

Baha'i
The Antichrist is considered to subvert the religion of God from the inner reality of man as 'Abdu'l-Baha narrates: "Christ was a divine Center of unity and love. Whenever discord prevails instead of unity, wherever hatred and antagonism take the place of love and spiritual fellowship, Antichrist reigns instead of Christ."

In popular culture

In February 1900, the Christian Russian philosopher and mystic Vladimir Solovyov published the apocalyptic A Short Tale of the Antichrist, showing his prophetic vision about the oncoming 20th century and the end of the human history. It is prophesied that the antichrist will present himself to the whole humanity like a pacifist, ecologist and ecumenist, "will convoke an ecumenical council and will seek the consensus of all the Christian confessions, granting something to each one."

The enthronement of the Antichrist is associated with conspiracy theories and particularly a Satanic plot to destroy the Christian faith in St. Nicholas.

See also

 Armageddon
 The Beast
 Bible prophecy
 Christendom
 Lake of fire
 Mahdi
 New World Order (conspiracy theory)
 The Omen
 Prince of Peace
 References to the Antichrist in ecclesiastical writings
 Two witnesses
 Whore of Babylon

References

Citations

Bibliography

External links

 Of Antichrist and His Ruin (1692) by John Bunyan. Online as part of the Acacia John Bunyan Online Library.
 
 
 
 Lutheran Scholarly Works on the Antichrist
 OrthodoxWiki: Antichrist
 

 
Book of Revelation
Christian eschatology
Christian messianism
Christian mythology
Christian terminology
Self-declared messiahs
Supernatural legends
Unnamed people of the Bible
First Epistle of John
Second Epistle of John
Satanism